Turbinaria patula, commonly known as disc coral,  is a species of colonial stony coral in the family Dendrophylliidae. It is native to the Indo-Pacific region, being found in the eastern Indian Ocean, northern Australia, the South China Sea and the western Pacific Ocean. It is a zooxanthellate coral that houses symbiont dinoflagellates in its tissues. It is an uncommon species and the International Union for Conservation of Nature (IUCN) has rated it as a "vulnerable" species.

Description
Its colonies contain upright fronds that are not folded uniformly and contain inclined tube-shaped corallites. Its corallites have  openings of elliptical shapes. It is green, grey or brown in colour. T. patula is a zooxanthellate coral and houses symbiont dinoflagellates in its tissues.

Distribution
Figures of its population are unknown but are considered to be decreasing, but is likely to be threatened by the global reduction of coral reefs, the increase of temperature causing coral bleaching, climate change, human activity, parasites, and disease. It is an uncommon species throughout most of its range and the International Union for Conservation of Nature has assessed its conservation status as being "vulnerable". It occurs in the eastern Indian Ocean, northern Australia, the South China Sea and the northwestern, western, and western central Pacific Ocean. Ten species were exported in 2005 for aquariums.

Taxonomy
It was described as Gemmipora patula by James Dwight Dana in 1846. Synonyms include Gemmipora patula, Turbinaria bankae, Turbinaria cupula, Turbinaria fungiformis, and Turbinaria robusta.

References

Dendrophylliidae
Corals described in 1846